Park Road 4 (PR 4) is a  park road in western Burnet County, Texas that travels through and provides access to Longhorn Cavern State Park and Inks Lake State Park. The highway connects State Highway 29 (SH 29) to U.S. Route 281 (US 281). The highway was constructed between 1934 and 1942 by the Civilian Conservation Corps (CCC), Works Progress Administration (WPA) and Texas State Highway Department (TSHD).

Route description
PR 4 begins at SH 29 near Buchanan Dam. The road then continues eastward through Inks Lake State Park.

History

The CCC constructed the first several miles in the mid-1930s to provide visitor access from US 281 to the newly renovated Longhorn Cavern State Park. Works Progress Administration workers extended the road west of the park headquarters in the early 1940s. The road connected with Ranch to Market Road 2342 (RM 2342) and was finally completed concurrently with the construction of Inks Lake State Park about 1942.

Between 1934 and 1942 the CCC and the TSHD built the eastern entrance portals, masonry bridges, retaining walls, two parking overlooks, culverts and guard walls. Large live oak and other trees were preserved by the CCC during road work, as indicated by historic plans and sketches. The CCC designed and installed additional plantings of native species at three locations along the roadway; the entrance portals, Longhorn Cavern, and Parking Overlook B.

All of PR 4 and Longhorn Cavern State Park were listed on the National Register of Historic Places on February 7, 2011, as the Park Road 4 Historic District. Longhorn Cavern was designated a National Natural Landmark in 1971. The CCC Museum building,  located along the route and built to serve as the park administrative building at Longhorn Cavern, was designated a Recorded Texas Historic Landmark in 1989.

Major intersections

See also

 List of Park Roads in Texas
 National Register of Historic Places listings in Burnet County, Texas
 Recorded Texas Historic Landmarks in Burnet County

References

External links

 National Register of Historic Places Registration Form: Park Road 4 Historic District
 

0004
Transportation in Burnet County, Texas
Civilian Conservation Corps in Texas
Historic districts on the National Register of Historic Places in Texas
Works Progress Administration in Texas
National Register of Historic Places in Burnet County, Texas
Roads on the National Register of Historic Places in Texas